The Nadoda are a Rajput community found in the state of Gujarat, India.They are notable for their historic refusal to pay taxes to the sultans.

Origin
While having their origins in the regions of Malwa and Rajasthan, they are primarily found in the Saurashtra, Kutch, Patan and other region of Gujarat, India.

History
Nadoda Rajputs are one of the Rajput communities of Gujarat, they migrated from Rajasthan about six hundred years ago. The belief is that the Nadoda refuse to pay taxes to the Muslim rulers. Hence, they were called Naravaya (defaulters) and Nadoda is its corrupt form. The term "Nadoda" dates back to the Muslim invasion of India. As regards the explanations of the word nadoda, it is to be derived from Nadavata, transferred to the ——a declension in Prakrit. Thus Nadava give rise to word Nadoda.

Culture

Nadoda Rajputs are Kshatriya by varna. They are followers of Swaminarayan Sampradaya while some are the followers of Kuldevi. Lord Shiva and Krishna are their primary deities.

Nadoda Rajputs have four ghols (marriage circles) and marital alliances between them is restricted. In case of dress, ornaments, customs, social practices and style of life each ghol is specific in relation to others. They are aligned to Rajputs-Darbar groups, They are one of the members of ther-tasili.

Clans
Nadoda Rajputs further have ataks (clans) which enjoy an equal social status. These clans (ataks: Surnames) are Avera, Barad, Bhati, Chavda, Chavad, Chudasama, Chohan, Dabhi, Daima (Dahima), Dod, Dodiya, Galecha, Gohil, Goletar, Hadial, Herma, Jadav, Jiriya, Jethva, Kuchhotia, Kher, Lakum, Makvana (Makwana), Mori, Masani, Narvan, Padhar, Padhiar, Palonia, Parmar, Rathod, Rehevar, Solanki, Sedhál(Sindhav), Suvar(Sur), Tank, Tuar(Tunvar), Vadhel, Vaghela, Vaish(Vainsh), Vaja, Vala, Vanol, Vejol(Vihol). They are Kshatriya through Akhil Bharatiya Kshatriya Mahasabha.

Notebale People

Balvantsinh Rajput, Patan

See also 
 Chavda dynasty
 Rajputs of Gujarat
 Jadeja
 Garasia
 Molesalam Rajput
 Vantia

References 

History of Gujarat
Rajput clans of Gujarat